Antal (Tony) Pusztai (born 7 May 1978) is a classical guitarist who is known as both a jazz musician and a classical guitarist.

He was born in Györ, Hungary on 7 May 1978. When he was seven, his father started to teach him how to play the guitar. Later on, he studied under the tutelage of Professor Ede Roth at the Györ conservatorium. From 2005 to 2009, he was taught by Professor Alvaro Pierri at the University of Music and the Performing Arts in Vienna.

Between 1998 and 2014 he was awarded fifteen first prizes in guitar competitions both in Europe and in the USA. Some of his awards include the Herbert von Karajan Music Competition in Vienna, the Montreux Jazz Guitar Competition in 2004, the European Guitar Award in Dresden in 2006, and the Lee Ritenour Six String Theory in Los Angeles in 2014. He was performing with many well-known soloists and orchestras, including Erwin Schrott, Dalibor Karvay, Ralph Towner, Rosenberg Trio, Al di Meola, Pat Metheny, Lee Ritenour, and the Jánoska Ensemble.

His first solo album was recorded in Hungary in 2000 and the second in 2007 by the Wildner Records. In 2015 he was a featuring artist on the album ‘Twist of Rit ’with Lee Ritenour, which was nominated for a Grammy. Since 2017 he is the guitarist of Fortissimo Music Band *web

In September 2021, Pusztai established a quintet bearing his name with his fellow bandmates from the Fortissimo Music Band *web

Discography
 Beyond My Dreams (2000)
Wonderland (Wildner, 2007) - Production Studio: Kleine Audiowelt mp3-track

Intentational Guitar Competitions, Awards

 1998: International Guitar Competition in Kutna Hora, Czech Republic: 1st place
 1999: Yamaha International Guitar Competition, Vienna – Austria: 1st place
 2000: ‘Attila Zoller’ International Guitar Competition, Budapest – Hungary: 1st place
 2001: Radio Music Awards – Hungary
 2002: Baross Gábor Award – Hungary
 2003: Herbert von Karajan Scholarship – Austria
 2004: Montreux Jazz Guitar Competition – Switzerland: 1st place
 2005: International Guitar Competition, Weikersheim – Germany: 1st place
 2006: European Guitar Competition, Dresden – Germany: 1st place
 2014: Lee Ritenour's Six String Theory - Grand Price Winner

Interviews
Interview by Kádi Péter 
Interview (14 July 2004) by magazine "Hangszer és Zene"

External links 
Info
Biography (Harmonia Cordis International Classical Guitar Festival, Tirgu Mures / Marosvásárhely)
Biography (Internationale Gitarrentage Wetzlar)
Biography (International Guitar Festival in Balatonfüred)
Biography (Fidelio) 
Biography (BMC: Budapest Music Center) 
Herbert von Karajan scholarship
Photos at an open-air concert in 2004

1978 births
Living people
People from Győr
Hungarian classical guitarists
Hungarian jazz guitarists
Male jazz musicians
Male guitarists
21st-century guitarists
Hungarian male musicians